Poor-man's-orchid or poor man's orchid may refer to the following plants:

 Members of the genus Bauhinia
 Impatiens balfourii, a species of the genus Impatiens
 Members of the genus Schizanthus